Gonocarpus montanus is a shrub in the watermilfoil family Haloragaceae native to eastern Australia and New Zealand. Common names include mountain raspwort.

References

Flora of Victoria (Australia)
Flora of New South Wales
montanus
Plants described in 1847